Schwetzingen is a German town in northwest Baden-Württemberg, around  southwest of Heidelberg and  southeast of Mannheim. 
Schwetzingen is one of the five biggest cities of the Rhein-Neckar-Kreis district and a medium-sized centre between Heidelberg and Mannheim.

The city is most famous for Schwetzingen Palace and the Schlosstheater. The palace grounds also feature a mosque, the oldest in Germany. Although not functional, it was used by Muslim prisoners in the Franco-Prussian War.

Geography 

Schwetzingen is located in the Rhine-Neckar-triangle in the plain of the Rhine river, lying west of the Odenwald and in the east of the Rhine. A small stream, the Leimbach, runs through the city before joining the Rhine.

Neighbouring municipalities 

The following municipalities, listed clockwise beginning in the north, border on the city limits of Schwetzingen:
Mannheim, Plankstadt, Oftersheim, Hockenheim, Ketsch and Brühl. The municipal area of Schwetzingen is completely consolidated with Oftersheim. The limits of Plankstadt are only separated by one street from the limits of Schwetzingen.

History 

Schwetzingen was mentioned as "Suezzingen" for the first time in 766, recorded in the late twelfth-century Codex Aureus of Lorsch, but there are already traces of settlement from the Stone Age. 
Originally it consisted of two settlements, Ober- and Unterschwetzingen, that grew together in the course of the 17th and 18th century. Originally the town belonged to the diocese of Worms, but later passed to the Counts of the Palatinate in the 12th century.

The moated castle of Schwetzingen is mentioned for the first time in 1350. It was destroyed in the Thirty Years' War and in the following War of the Palatinate Succession; it was rebuilt by count Johann Wilhelm and his predecessor. From 1720 it served temporarily as the residence of the Elector Karl III Philip (1716–1742) after he moved away from Heidelberg. Later on it served as a summer residence of the Elector of the Palatinate and their court.

Schwetzingen Castle began as a simple aristocratic fishing retreat (much like Versailles and Karlsruhe which began as hunting lodges) and had an eventful architectural history, in several phases of construction, especially during the reigns of the Elector Karl III Philip and Karl IV Theodor (1742–1799) who, as their answer to Versailles, embellished the castle gardens with some of the finest and most elaborate formal water parterres in Germany gardens.

As it evolved, the high central Baroque block of the Castle was extended to either side (from 1747 onwards) in matching curved ranges of glazed arcades that were punctuated by pavilions which followed the arc of the vast garden circle. They partly enclose the circle bisected by a wide gravel axis flanked by parterres which centers on a spring-fed water-basin inspired by the bassin of Diana at Versailles, but here expressing the more appropriately water-centered Greek myth of the poet Arion and the dolphins.

On the other side at the entrance, a mulberry-tree allée stretched from the centre of the Castle to the city of Heidelberg, 10 km away on the horizon, truly a remarkable feat of autocratic landscaping.

The curving outbuildings of Schwetzingen inspired the smaller Rococo perfections of Schloss Benrath, with its quarter arcs of matching corps de logis embracing a formal sheet of water, built for Carl Theodor near Düsseldorf, 1756–1770.

In 1759 Schwetzingen received permission to host markets and was developed into a baroque city through the 18th century. In 1803 all the territories of the Palatine electorate east of the Rhine, including Schwetzingen were absorbed into the Grand Duchy of Baden and the castle became a residence of the Grand Dukes of Baden. In 1833 Schwetzingen was elevated to city status by Leopold, Grand Duke of Baden. The beginning of industrialization in Schwetzingen in the year 1850 made the city an important seat of cigar factories and canneries. Also, the cultivation of asparagus gained importance and has remained one of Schwetzingen's claim to fame.

For more information visit: www.schwetzingen.de

Population development

These figures are estimates only, official census results (¹) or statistics of the resident's registration office. 

¹ official census results

Politics

Local council 
The local council of Schwetzingen has 26 members since the last elections in June 2009.

Elections in May 2014:

Mayors

1833 – 1838: Daniel Helmreich
1838 – 1851: Carl Welde
1851 – 1855: Josef Vetter
1855 – 1865: Johann Wilhelm Ihm
1865 – 1883: Heinrich Wittmann
1883 – 1898: Karl Mechling
1898 – 1904: Heinrich Häfner
1904 – 1910: Jean Wipfinger
1910 – 1914: Wilfried Hartmann
1914 – 1923: Jakob Reinhard
1914 – 1918: Georg Pitsch
1923 – 1929: Johannes Götz
1929 – 1930: Leopold Stratthaus
1930 – 1933: Dr. Arthur Trautmann
1933 – 1945: Arthur Stober
1945: Ernst Karl
1945 – 1948: Dr. Valentin Gaa
1948 – 1954: Franz Dusberger
1954 – 1961: Hans Kahrmann
1961 – 1962: Adolf Schmitt
1962 – 1981: Kurt Waibel
1981 – 1982: Walter Bährle
1982 – 1998: Gerhard Stratthaus
1999 – 2007: Bernd Kappenstein
2007 – 2008: Bernd Junker
since 2008: René Pöltl

Coat of arms 
The coat of arms of Schwetzingen consists of a divided shield with a golden lion on the upper half on a black background and on the lower half there is a silver ring on blue background. The city flag is white and blue.
The lion symbolizes the Palatine Electorate, of which Schwetzingen was a member until 1803. The ring was originally a wheel originating from the seal of an inhabitant who had contacts to the castle of Schwetzingen.

Twin towns
Schwetzingen is twinned with:

Economy and infrastructure

Transport
Schwetzingen lies relatively favourably between the two autobahns A 5 (with the junction Heidelberg/Schwetzingen) and A 6 (with the junctions Schwetzingen/Hockenheim and Mannheim/Schwetzingen). Schwetzingen station was opened in 1870 on the Rhine Railway, connecting Mannheim and Karlsruhe.

Between 1910 and 1938 there was a tramline connecting Schwetzingen and Ketsch, between 1927 and 1973 there was also a tramline connecting Heidelberg with Schwetzingen.

Media 
In Schwetzingen the daily newspaper is the "Schwetzinger Zeitung", which is a local newspaper published by the "Mannheimer Morgen".

Public institutions
In Schwetzingen there is a district court, a notary's office, an internal revenue service, a customs office and an employment office.

Education 

The city maintains the Hebel-Gymnasium, the Karl-Friedrich-Schimper-Realschule, the Hilda Hauptschule, four elementary schools (Grundschule Hirschacker, Johann-Michael-Zeyher Grundschule, Nordstadt-Grundschule and Südstadt-Grundschule) as well as a special school, the Kurt-Waibel-Förderschule.
Furthermore there are two vocational schools (Carl-Theodor- and Erhart-Schott-School) and the Comenius-School for mentally handicapped.
In the left wing of Schwetzingen's castle there is an advanced technical college for administration of justice, maintained by the state of Baden-Württemberg.

Main sights

Theatre
The Schlosstheater Schwetzingen, which was built as the Schlosstheatre ("castle theatre") in 1751–1752 by Nicolas de Pigage, is located in the complex of Schloss Schwetzingen, which hosts, among other events, the annual opera and music festival, the Schwetzingen Festival. The theatre fell into disuse by the late 19th century, but was renovated in 1937 and given its present name after its Rococo style of architecture and used by the Festival since 1952. Between 1971 and 1974, it was modernized and re-opened with 450 seats for opera and 510 seats for drama. It is the oldest surviving theatre in Europe with boxless circles.

Buildings 

Schwetzingen Castle is the city's most famous landmark. Its gardens are also notable, as there are elements of French Baroque and the English garden style, with statuary by Peter Anton von Verschaffelt. Also worth seeing are the theatre, the orangery, the bath and various follies, including the temples of Apollo, Mercury and Minerva, the Mosque (built 1778–1791) and the fountain of Arion.

The city hall was built in 1821 and expanded in 1889, 1912 and 1919.

There are four churches in Schwetzingen:
Catholic church St. Pankratius (built 1736-38, modified 1763-65)
Catholic church St. Maria (built 1958)
Catholic church St. Josef
Protestant church (built 1756, expanded 1884-88 and 1912-13)

Regular events
Schwetzinger Festspiele (late April to early June) 
Mozartfestival (September/October)
European Concours d'Elegance
the castle square party
Spargelfest
Fiesta Mexicana
Christmas fair

Scenic byways
Schwetzingen is located on three major tourist or theme routes:
 The Baden Asparagus Road, leading from Schwetzingen to Lichtenau-Scherzheim.
 The Bertha Benz Memorial Route, leading from Mannheim to Pforzheim and back via Schwetzingen.
 The Castle Road, leading from Mannheim via Schwetzingen to Prague.

Notable people

Sons and daughters of the town

 Countess Palatine Maria Franziska of Sulzbach (1724–1794), Countess Palatine of Zweibrücken-Birkenfeld by marriage
 Countess Palatine Maria Anna of Zweibrücken-Birkenfeld (1753–1824), Countess Palatine of Birkenfeld-Gelnhausen and Duchess in Bavaria, by marriage
 Maximilian I Joseph of Bavaria (1756–1825), king of Bavaria
 Franz Danzi (1763–1826), composer, conductor and cellist
 Franz Cramer (1772–1848), an English violinist and conductor 
 Louis Lingg (1864–1887), trade unionist and anarchist
 Rudolf Louis (1870–1914), a German music critic and conductor
 Otto Abetz (1903–1958), ambassador of Nazi-Germany in Vichy France, convicted of crimes against humanity
 Thomas Erle (born 1952), writer and crime writer
 Gerrit Müller (born 1984), football player

Personalities associated with Schwetzingen

 Karl Drais (1785–1851), after the Heidelberg studies in forestry teacher at a private educational institution, inventor of the original bicycle
 Karl Theodor Hartweg (1812–1871), botanist
 Johann Peter Hebel (1760–1826), poet, theologian and educator, died in Schwetzingen. Hebel is the namesake of the Hebel-Gymnasium Schwetzingen 
 Karl Friedrich Schimper (1803–1867), naturalist, botanist and geologist

See also 
 Asteroid 281764 Schwetzingen

References

External links

homepage of Schwetzingen
homepage of the Rhein-Neckar-district
More information about the Schloss and its garden

Rhein-Neckar-Kreis
Baden